Karoor Neelakanta Pillai (Malayalam: കാരൂർ നീലകണ്ഠപ്പിള്ള) (22 February 1898 – 30 September 1975) was an Indian writer of Malayalam literature and one of the founders of Sahithya Pravarthaka Co-operative Society (Writers' Co-operative Society). Some of his works such as Poovan Pazham and Marappavakal are counted by many among the best short stories in Malayalam. He was a recipient of the Kerala Sahitya Akademi Award for Children's Literature in 1960, which he received for his work Anakkaran, and the Kerala Sahitya Akademi Award for Story in 1969, which he received for his short story Mothiram.

Life and career 
Karoor Neelakanta Pillai was born on February 22, 1898, in Ettumanoor, in Kottayam district of the south Indian state of Kerala to Kunhiliyamma and Neelakanta Pillai. His formal education lasted only up to 7th standard though he was known to have been good at studies. He began his career as a school teacher at a local school in Kadappoor but quit his job when he got a government job as a teacher at the local school in Pothanikkad. While on job at various places such as Ettumanoor, Vemballi and Kanakkari, he pursued his studies and passed 9th standard in 1913 as well as the teachers' training examinations.

Pillai became associated with the Adhyapaka Maha Sabha (teachers' union) in 1920 and two years later, he was elected as its secretary. He was involved in the teachers' meeting that discussed strike and though the matter was voted out by the meeting, the government dismissed all teachers who participated in the meeting; Pillai also lost his job. He worked as an assistant to a local ayurvedic physician at Ettumanoor till he was reinstated in his job by the government, with a posting at Namakkuzhi school. After holding the post for a while, he took long leave from job and became the secretary of Kottayam Co-operative Union. Moving to the village of Panmana, he started trading in coir products and it was in 1930, he married Gomathy Amma. When the coir industry went through a lean period during the World War II, he quit trading and returned to teaching, this time at the local school in Thazhava village.

It was during this time, Pillai, along with M. P. Paul, worked towards forming a co-operative for writers and in 1945, with a capital of  120, they registered the Sahithya Pravarthaka Sahakarana Sangham (SPCS - Writers' Cooperative Society) with Paul and Pillai as the president and the secretary of the society, respectively. He held the position of the secretary for two decades and when he relinquished the position in 1965, the society had already made a mark in the publishing sector, with the integration of National Book Stall in 1949.

He died in September 30th,1975, at the age of 77.

Bibliography 
Pillai, Vaikom Muhammad Basheer and Uroob are considered to be the preeminent storytellers in Malayalam literature. His short stories often portray the plight of the middle class in a simple and straightforward manner. Many of his stories were translated into other Indian languages and English. The short story Anakkaran (The Mahout) was translated into English by Santa Ramesvara Rao. He wrote many stories for children and his story Anchu Kadalasu was later adapted for a film of the same name. He received the Kerala Sahitya Akademi Award for Children's Literature in 1960 for Anakkaran and the Kerala Sahitya Akademi Award for Story in 1969 for Mothiram.

The following is a list of works published by Karoor Neelakanta Pillai.

Short stories

Children's literature

Others

Notes

References

Malayalam-language writers
Writers from Kottayam
Malayalam short story writers
1898 births
1975 deaths
20th-century Indian short story writers
Indian male short story writers
20th-century Indian male writers
20th-century Indian novelists
Malayalam novelists
20th-century Indian dramatists and playwrights
Indian children's writers